The Qods Saeghe ("lightning bolt") is a simple Iranian recoverable target drone.

Design
The Saeghe has low-mounted delta wings and a bullet-shaped fuselage. It has a sweptback wing rudder and no landing gear. Control surfaces are located on the horizontal stabilizers. The Saeghe is constructed entirely of composite. It is powered by one 18.6 kW (25 hp) WAE-342 pusher engine in a pusher configuration.

The Saeghe is launched via a small rocket from a short metal rail, called a JATO launch. It is recovered by parachute over land or water (as a plastic drone, it floats) or by skidding on its belly over flat terrain.

Variants 
It comes in two versions. The first one which only has radio command guidance system and the other one which has GPS guidance and IR emissions. Both versions are launched via a booster and are recovered by parachute.

Saeghe-1
The Saeghe 1's flight path and maneuvers are controlled by simple radio command. This variant is also known as the N-Q-A 100.

Saeghe-2
The Saeghe-2 has more advanced avionics, with tele-command and telemetry uplinks and downlinks between the drone and the ground control station. The Saeghe 2 also has GPS navigation it can use to follow navigational points on autopilot beyond the line-of-sight of the operator. The Saeghe-2 shares the same airframe as the Saeghe-1.

The Saeghe 2 carries a gyrostabilized radar reflector and three IR flares. It is controlled from a ground control station which can be carried in a small van. The Saeghe 2 first flew in 2002.

Specifications (Saeghe-2)

References

Saeghe
Single-engined pusher aircraft
Unmanned military aircraft of Iran
Target drones
Military equipment of Iran